The 1961–62 Egyptian Premier League, was the 12th season of the Egyptian Premier League, the top Egyptian professional league for association football clubs, since its establishment in 1948. The season started on 6 October 1961 and concluded on 22 April 1962.
Al Ahly managed to win the league for the eleventh time in the club's history.

League table 

 (C)= Champions, (R)= Relegated, Pld = Matches played; W = Matches won; D = Matches drawn; L = Matches lost; F = Goals for; A = Goals against; ± = Goal difference; Pts = Points.

Top goalscorers

Teams

References

External links 
 All Egyptian Competitions Info

5
1961–62 in African association football leagues
1961–62 in Egyptian football